Goodbye, New York is a 1985 Israeli-American comedy drama produced, directed and written by Amos Kollek, who also co-stars in his directorial debut.

Plot
A ditzy New Yorker (Julie Hagerty) is devastated to learn that her husband has been unfaithful and impulsively decides to go to Paris to escape. When she consumes too many sedatives and oversleeps on the plane, missing her connection, she winds up in Tel Aviv, penniless and with no luggage or friends.  After connecting with a cabdriver and part-time soldier (Amos Kollek), she finds herself stranded on a kibbutz near the Golan Heights where she must learn to cope with a series of misadventures and a very unfamiliar lifestyle.

Cast
Julie Hagerty as Nancy Callaghan
Amos Kollek as David
Shmuel Shilo as Moishe
Aviva Ger as Illana
Dudu Topaz as Albert
Jennifer Prichard as Lisa
Christopher Goutman as Jack
Hanan Goldblatt as Avi
Mosko Alkalai as Papalovski
Joseph Kaplanian as himself (Elderly Man turning round in close up shot by Church of the Holy Sepulchre)
Ron Rabinovich as man with afro in airport
Sophie Haber as herself  (white-haired pilgrim woman in Jerusalem)

Critical reception
Janet Maslin of The New York Times said the film possesses "an easygoing charm that, among Israeli films, is rare", presenting "witty impressions of Israeli life" and the clash of cultures. Candace Russell of the South Florida Sun-Sentinel likened Kollek's "absurdist worldview and droll understatement" to that of Woody Allen. While People thought the film "likable" and "genial", the reviewers noted its "uneven" script and direction, and a "sometimes contrived or just plain silly" plot. London's Time Out was more unequivocal, dismissing the "thin and clichéd material", its "predictable plot and dismal propaganda about the values of kibbutz culture."

References

External links

1985 films
1985 directorial debut films
English-language Israeli films
Films about the kibbutz
Films directed by Amos Kollek
Films shot in Israel
1980s English-language films